In mathematics, a -system (or pi-system) on a set  is a collection  of certain subsets of  such that

  is non-empty.
 If  then 

That is,  is a non-empty family of subsets of  that is closed under non-empty finite intersections.
The importance of -systems arises from the fact that if two probability measures agree on a -system, then they agree on the -algebra generated by that -system. Moreover, if other properties, such as equality of integrals, hold for the -system, then they hold for the generated -algebra as well. This is the case whenever the collection of subsets for which the property holds is a -system. -systems are also useful for checking independence of random variables.

This is desirable because in practice, -systems are often simpler to work with than -algebras. For example, it may be awkward to work with -algebras generated by infinitely many sets  So instead we may examine the union of all -algebras generated by finitely many sets  This forms a -system that generates the desired -algebra. Another example is the collection of all intervals of the real line, along with the empty set, which is a -system that generates the very important Borel -algebra of subsets of the real line.

Definitions

A -system is a non-empty collection of sets  that is closed under non-empty finite intersections, which is equivalent to  containing the intersection of any two of its elements. 
If every set in this -system is a subset of  then it is called a  

It is equal to the intersection of all -systems containing  and can be explicitly described as the set of all possible non-empty finite intersections of elements of 

A non-empty family of sets has the finite intersection property if and only if the -system it generates does not contain the empty set as an element.

Examples

 For any real numbers  and  the intervals  form a -system, and the intervals  form a -system if the empty set is also included. 
 The topology (collection of open subsets) of any topological space is a -system. 
 Every filter is a -system. Every -system that doesn't contain the empty set is a prefilter (also known as a filter base). 
 Every -algebra is a -system.

Relationship to -systems

 
 if  then 
 if  is a sequence of (pairwise)  subsets in  then 

Whilst it is true that any -algebra satisfies the properties of being both a -system and a -system, it is not true that any -system is a -system, and moreover it is not true that any -system is a -algebra. However, a useful classification is that any set system which is both a -system and a -system is a -algebra. This is used as a step in proving the - theorem.

The - theorem

The - theorem can be used to prove many elementary measure theoretic results. For instance, it is used in proving the uniqueness claim of the Carathéodory extension theorem for -finite measures.

The - theorem is closely related to the monotone class theorem, which provides a similar relationship between monotone classes and algebras, and can be used to derive many of the same results. Since -systems are simpler classes than algebras, it can be easier to identify the sets that are in them while, on the other hand, checking whether the property under consideration determines a -system is often relatively easy. Despite the difference between the two theorems, the - theorem is sometimes referred to as the monotone class theorem.

Example

Let  be two measures on the -algebra  and suppose that  is generated by a -system  If
 for all  and 

then 
This is the uniqueness statement of the Carathéodory extension theorem for finite measures. If this result does not seem very remarkable, consider the fact that it usually is very difficult or even impossible to fully describe every set in the -algebra, and so the problem of equating measures would be completely hopeless without such a tool.

Idea of the proof
Define the collection of sets

It follows from the - theorem that  and so  That is to say, the measures agree on

-Systems in probability

-systems are more commonly used in the study of probability theory than in the general field of measure theory. This is primarily due to probabilistic notions such as independence, though it may also be a consequence of the fact that the - theorem was proven by the probabilist Eugene Dynkin. Standard measure theory texts typically prove the same results via monotone classes, rather than -systems.

Equality in distribution

The - theorem motivates the common definition of the probability distribution of a random variable  in terms of its cumulative distribution function. Recall that the cumulative distribution of a random variable  is defined as

whereas the seemingly more general  of the variable is the probability measure 

where  is the Borel -algebra.

A similar result holds for the joint distribution of a random vector.

However,  and  Because 

is a -system generated by the random pair  the - theorem is used to show that the joint cumulative distribution function suffices to determine the joint law of  In other words,  and  have the same distribution if and only if they have the same joint cumulative distribution function.

In the theory of stochastic processes, two processes  are known to be equal in distribution if and only if they agree on all finite-dimensional distributions; that is, for all 

The proof of this is another application of the - theorem.

Independent random variables

The theory of -system plays an important role in the probabilistic notion of independence.

which is to say that  are independent. This actually is a special case of the use of -systems for determining the distribution of

Example

Let  where  are iid standard normal random variables. Define the radius and argument (arctan) variables

To prove this, it is sufficient to show that the -systems  are independent: that is, for all  and 

Confirming that this is the case is an exercise in changing variables. Fix  and  then the probability can be expressed as an integral of the probability density function of

See also

Notes

Citations

References

 
 
  

Measure theory
Families of sets